Acacia proiantha  is a species of wattle native to the Northern Territory, Australia.

References

proiantha
Flora of the Northern Territory